The Church of the Ascension in Mt. Sterling, Kentucky is a historic Episcopal church at High and Broadway Streets. It was built in 1878 and added to the National Register in 1979.

It is a Gothic Revival-style church designed by architect Frank Fitch in 1878, with board and batten exterior that follows the architectural ideology of A.J. Downing.

The Anglican parish was formed in 1858.

References

Episcopal church buildings in Kentucky
Churches on the National Register of Historic Places in Kentucky
Carpenter Gothic church buildings in Kentucky
Churches completed in 1878
19th-century Episcopal church buildings
Churches in Montgomery County, Kentucky
National Register of Historic Places in Montgomery County, Kentucky
1878 establishments in Kentucky
Mount Sterling, Kentucky